Mohammad Salah (also Romanized as Moḩammad Şalāḩ and Moḩammad Şāleḩ) is a village in Baba Jik Rural District, in the Central District of Chaldoran County, West Azerbaijan Province, Iran. At the 2006 census, its population was 57, in 9 families.

References 

Populated places in Chaldoran County